Inside Ravens Bluff, The Living City is an adventure module published in 1990 for the Advanced Dungeons & Dragons fantasy role-playing game.

Plot summary
Inside Ravens Bluff describes the locations and inhabitants of the city of Ravens Bluff.

Publication history
LC2 Inside Ravens Bluff, The Living City was compiled by Jean Rabe and edited by Rabe and Skip Williams, with a cover by Kevin Ward and interior illustrations by Jim Holloway, and was published by TSR in 1990 as a 64-page booklet with an outer folder.

The content of this book was designed by members of the RPGA.

Reception

Reviews

References

Dungeons & Dragons modules
Role-playing game supplements introduced in 1990